The West Bengal Film Journalists' Association Award for Best Actor in a supporting Role is given yearly by WBFJA as a part of its annual West Bengal Film Journalists' Association Awards for Bengali films, to recognize the best actor of the previous year.

Superlatives

List of Winners

Nominations

2017 

 Ritwick Chakraborty for Saheb Bibi Golam
 Arun Guhathakurta for Cinemawala
 Dev for Zulfiqar
 Jisshu Sengupta for Kelor Kirti
 Rahul Banerjee for Khawto

2018  

 Kaushik Ganguly for Bishorjan
 Paran Bandopadhyay for Posto 
 Kaushik Sen for Durga Sohay
 Bratya Basu for Asamapta
 Rana Mitra for Messi
 Ritwick Chakraborty for Chhaya O Chhobi

2019  

 Anjan Dutt for Uma
 Soham Chakraborty for Rongberonger Korhi
 Arjun Chakrabarty in Guptodhoner Sandhane
 Adil Hussain in Ahare Mon
 Kamaleshwar Mukherjee in Pupa
 Shantilal Mukherjee in Bagh Bondhi Khela

2020  

 Rudranil Ghosh for Kedara
 Shubhomoy Chatterjee for Mahalaya
 Anirban Bhattacharya for Finally Bhalobasha
 Anjan Dutt for Surjo Prithibir Chardike Ghore
 Jisshu Sengupta for Mahalaya

See also 

 West Bengal Film Journalists' Association Award for Best Actor
 West Bengal Film Journalists' Association Award for Best Actress
 West Bengal Film Journalists' Association Awards
 Cinema of India

References 

West Bengal Film Journalists' Association Awards
Award ceremonies
Indian awards